The 2013 FINA Swimming World Cup was a series of eight, two-day, short course meets in eight different cities between August and November 2013. Arena was again the title sponsor for the series, with Omega serving as official timer.

Meets
As of June 2013, the 2013 World Cup consists of the following eight meets:

World Cup standings
 Composition of points:
 Best performances (by meets): 1st place: 24 points, 2nd place: 18 points and 3rd place: 12 points;
 Points for medals (in individual events): Gold medal: 12 points, Silver medal: 9 points and Bronze medal: 6 points;
 Bonus for World Record (WR): 20 points.

Men
Official overall scoring:

Women
Official overall scoring:

Event winners

50 m freestyle

100 m freestyle

200 m freestyle

400 m freestyle

1500 m (men)/800 m (women) freestyle

50 m backstroke

100 m backstroke

200 m backstroke

50 m breaststroke

100 m breaststroke

200 m breaststroke

50 m butterfly

100 m butterfly

200 m butterfly

100 m individual medley

* Katinka Hosszú set a new World record of 57.45 seconds in the heats of this event in Berlin.

200 m individual medley

400 m individual medley

Legend:

Mixed 4x50m freestyle relay

Mixed 4x50m medley relay

NOTE: The mixed relay is not included in the overall scoring of the World Cup.

References

External links 

FINA Swimming World Cup
FINA Swimming World Cup
2013 in Qatar
Swimming competitions in Qatar